Drax Hall Estate is a sugarcane plantation situated in Saint George, Barbados, in the Caribbean. 

Drax Hall still stands on the site where sugar cane was first cultivated on Barbados and is one of the island's three remaining Jacobean houses.

History 

The estate has belonged to the Drax family since the early 1650s when it was built by James Drax and his brother, William Drax, early settlers in Jamaica. The Drax's Caribbean slave plantations and estates then descended with that of Charborough House in Dorset. 

By 1680, Henry Drax was the owner of the largest plantations on Barbados, then in parish of St. John. A planter-merchant, Drax had a hired 'proper persons' to act in, and do all business in Bridgetown.'

Legacy
Historian Hilary Beckles estimated that close to 30,000 enslaved African men, women and children died on the Drax Caribbean plantations over 200 years. By 1832 there were 275 people enslaved on the plantation producing 300 tons of sugar and 140 puncheons of rum.

Ownership
The estate continues as a sugar plantation but Drax Hall is closed to the public, although its grounds spanning much of the eastern landscape of the parish of Saint George are open to visitors. The current owner is Richard Drax, a British member of parliament, who inherited the property after the death of his father, Henry Walter Plunkett-Ernle-Erle-Drax (1928–2017), a former High Sheriff of Dorset. The Drax family also owned slave plantations in Jamaica, which they sold in the mid-1800s.

See also
Admiral the Hon. Sir Reginald Plunkett-Ernle-Erle-Drax
List of plantations in Barbados

References 

Drax family
Houses in Barbados
Jacobean architecture
Houses completed in the 17th century
History of the Colony of Barbados
Saint George, Barbados
Agriculture in Barbados
Slavery in the British West Indies
Sugar plantations in Barbados